Mykhaylo Osadchy (March 22, 1936 in Kurmany, Nedryhailiv Raion, Sumy Oblast, UkSSR – July 5, 1994 in Lviv, Lviv Oblast, Ukraine) was a Ukrainian journalist, poet, writer, and dissident.

Mykhaylo Osadchy graduated from Lviv University in 1958. He taught there from 1960 to 1965. He was arrested in 1965, spent 8 months waiting for a court decision and was finally sentenced to two years' imprisonment in 1966. He was tried together with Mykhailo, Horyn's brother Bohdan Horyn, and M. Zvarychevska.

Osadchy was arrested for the second time in 1972. This time, he was sentenced to seven years of labour camp and three years of exile.

He was able to return to teaching at Lviv University in 1990. In 1992, Osadchy became a member of the Writer's Union of Ukraine.

Literary works 
Osadchy's first book of poetry, 'The Moonlit Field', was published in 1965 before his arrest. In 1971 his memoir 'Cataract', was published. It was translated into French in 1974 and into English by Marco Carynnyk in 1976. His second collection of poems was published in 1979 and was called 'Quos ego'. The third one, 'The Scythian Altar', was published in 1990.

Bibliography 
 M. Osadchy. Misyachne pole [Moonlit field].— Kamenyar, Lviv, 1965
 M. Osadchy. Bilmo: Avtobiohrafichny narys [Cataract. An autobiographical portrait] — Paris – Baltimore: Smoloskyp 1971
 M. Osadchy. Zustrich z vozhdem [Meeting with the leader] // Ukrainsky visnyk, 1987, №8.— pp. 18–25.

References

1936 births
1994 deaths
People from Sumy Oblast
Ukrainian writers